In numerical analysis, Ridders' method is a root-finding algorithm based on the false position method and the use of an exponential function to successively approximate a root of a continuous function . The method is due to C. Ridders.

Ridders' method is simpler than Muller's method or Brent's method but with similar performance. If the function is not well-behaved, the root remains bracketed and the length of the bracketing interval at least halves on each iteration, so convergence is guaranteed.

Method
One then finds the unique exponential function  such that function  satisfies . Specifically, parameter  is determined by

which will be used as one of the two bracketing values in the next step of the iteration. 

The procedure can be terminated when a given accuracy is obtained.

References

Root-finding algorithms